Anders Baasmo (born 29 January 1976) is a Norwegian actor originally from Hamar.

Baasmo graduated from the Norwegian Acting Academy in 2000. He started his professional career at the Trøndelag Teater in Trondheim, Norway. He later joined the Det Norske Teatret in Oslo.

Baasmo earned his breakthrough in 2003 when he received the Amanda award for his performance in the Norwegian picture Buddy. He won the TV award Gullruten in 2007 for his portrait of Henrik Ibsen in the TV-series An Immortal Man (En udødelig mann) on NRK.

Baasmo starred in the Swedish 2008 film Arn – The Kingdom at Road's End. That same year he won Norway's most prestigious actor's award, the Heddaprisen, for his interpretation of Hamlet. He then became the first actor to collect an Amanda, a Gullruten and a Hedda award.

He received the Shooting Stars Award, the annual acting award for up-and-coming actors by European Film Promotion, at the Berlin International Film Festival 2010.

Baasmo voiced Hans in the Norwegian dub of the Disney animated film Frozen and played Herman Watzinger in the 2012 adaptation of Thor Heyerdahl's Kon-Tiki. He also starred in the hit sitcom Dag between 2010 and 2015.

References

External links

 
 Anders Baasmo Christiansen at EFP - Shooting Stars

1976 births
People from Hamar
Norwegian male film actors
Norwegian male stage actors
Norwegian male television actors
Hamar Katedralskole alumni
Living people